Christian Airplay is a chart published weekly by Billboard magazine in the United States since June 21, 2003.

This chart lists the 50 most-listened-to records played on multiple Christian radio stations across the country as monitored by Nielsen BDS, weighted to each station's Nielsen ratings.

History
The chart was originally titled "Hot Christian Songs". The chart included the songs with the most airplay on monitored Christian radio stations in the United States. Beginning with the chart dated December 7, 2013, Billboard changed the methodology of the Hot Christian Songs chart to factor in digital sales, streaming, and airplay of Christian songs over all radio formats. Christian Airplay was created to continue the tracking of airplay on Christian radio stations.

As of the issue dated March 18, 2023 the current number-one single is "I See Grace" by Micah Tyler.

Chart policies
As with most other Billboard charts, the Christian Airplay chart features a rule for when a song enters a recurrent rotation. Starting with the chart week of December 2, 2006, a song is declared recurrent on the country charts if it has been on the charts longer than 20 weeks; is not gaining in spins or audience impressions; and is lower than 10 in rank for either audience impressions or spins. If a song has been on the charts for over 52 weeks, it will be declared recurrent if it is below 5 in rank.

Chart achievements

Most number-ones

Most weeks at number one

Source:

References

External links
Billboard Christian Airplay chart – online version.

Billboard charts